The 2021 All-Ireland Senior Hurling Championship was the 134th staging of the All-Ireland Senior Hurling Championship, the Gaelic Athletic Association's premier inter-county hurling tournament, since its establishment in 1887. The championship began on 26 June and ended on 22 August 2021.

Antrim, having won the 2020 Joe McDonagh Cup, returned to the Leinster Championship for the first time since the 2015 competition. Limerick entered the championship as the defending champions.

The All-Ireland final was played on 22 August 2021 at Croke Park in Dublin, between Limerick and Cork, in what was their first ever meeting in a final. Limerick won the match with a display that is regarded by many to be one of the greatest performances by a team in an All Ireland Final. Limerick showed immense dominance in the first half opening a 13 point gap, the scores 3-18 to 1-11 at the interval. This dominance would continue in the second half in more subdued fashion but Limerick still managed to extend their lead to 16 by the final whistle, the full time score 3-32 to 1-22. This was the first time in history that Limerick claimed back to back championships, their 10th championship title overall and third title in four seasons.

Cork's Patrick Horgan was the championship's top scorer with 0-54.

Limerick captain Declan Hannon also made history becoming only the second captain after the legendary Christy Ring to lift the Liam MacCarthy Cup on three separate occasions.

Format change

In December 2020, a plan by the Central Competitions Control Committee (CCCC) was approved by the GAA's management committee. The plan saw the introduction of a new format, with the championship being run on a provincial knock-out/qualifier basis, in line with the pre-2018 format, thus resulting in the provincial round robins being discarded. Relegation to and promotion from the Joe McDonagh Cup was re-introduced. The two beaten Leinster quarter-final teams are due to play a preliminary qualifier round, with the losers dropping to the McDonagh Cup and winners progressing to round 1 of the qualifiers.

Round 1 of the qualifiers will feature the playoff winners playing a Munster quarter-finalist or semi-finalist, and a Leinster semi-finalist playing a Munster quarter-finalist or semi-finalist.

Round 2 of the qualifiers will feature the Round 1 winners playing a Munster or Leinster semi-finalist, with the winners advancing to the All-Ireland quarter-finals.

The draws for the hurling championship were delayed until 19 and 20 April 2021 due to the COVID-19 pandemic.

Qualification and progression

Teams

Personnel and general information

Summary

Championships

2021 County Ranking (Championship)

Provincial championships

Leinster Senior Hurling Championship

Leinster quarter-finals

Leinster semi-finals

Leinster final

Munster Senior Hurling Championship

Munster quarter-final

Munster semi-finals

Munster final

All-Ireland Qualifiers

Bracket

Qualifiers preliminary round

The two teams beaten in the Leinster quarter-finals met in the preliminary round on 10 July with the winners going into the round 1 draw which was held on 12 July. Antrim were relegated to the 2022 Joe McDonagh Cup as a result of losing this match.

Qualifiers round 1

Qualifiers round 2

All-Ireland Senior Hurling Championship

All-Ireland quarter-finals

The beaten Leinster and Munster finalists play the two winners of round two of the qualifiers. The draw was made on 26 July.

All-Ireland semi-finals

All-Ireland final

Championship statistics

Top scorers

Top scorer overall

In a single game

Miscellaneous

Limerick won a Munster Senior Hurling Championship three-in-a-row for the first time since 1934–1935–1936.
Kilkenny's sixth year in a row without an All-Ireland senior title, equalling their title drought of 1994–1999.
Cork's sixteenth year in a row without an All-Ireland senior title, surpassing their title drought of 1904–1918.
Limerick scored 3-32 (41 points) in the All-Ireland final, the highest ever score in a final.
It is the first time since Kilkenny in 2014-2015 that a county team won back-to-back All Ireland Hurling Championship titles. 
Limerick retained the All-Ireland Senior Hurling Championship for the first time in their history. This was their tenth title, making them the first county outside the Big Three to reach double figures.
Limerick became the 6th county in history to win back-to-back All-Ireland hurling titles after Kilkenny, Cork, Tipperary, Galway and Wexford.
Cork reached the final for the first time since 2013.
Two new scoring feats were achieved on 24 July. Joe Canning surpassed Henry Shefflin's record haul to become the all-time top championship scorer. Patrick Horgan became the third player, after Canning and Shefflin, to have broken the 500-point barrier.
Limerick played against Tipperary, Waterford and Cork twice (Munster Semi-final and All-Ireland Final) to retain the Liam MacCarthy cup, the first time — and only time, to date — that any county won a championship playing only teams from a single province, in this case all Munster opposition.
Limerick had eleven players represented on The Sunday Game team of the year, a first for any male intercounty team in both Hurling and Gaelic Football, beating the previous record of nine representatives held by both Limerick in 2020 and Kilkenny in 2008.

Awards
Sunday Game Team of the Year
The Sunday Game team of the year was picked 22 August on the night of the final.
The panel consisting of Jackie Tyrrell, Brendan Cummins, Shane Dowling and Ursula Jacob chose Cian Lynch as the Sunday game player of the year.

1. Eoin Murphy (Kilkenny)
2. Sean Finn (Limerick)
3. Conor Prunty (Waterford)
4. Barry Nash (Limerick)
5. Diarmuid Byrnes (Limerick)
6. Declan Hannon (Limerick)
7. Kyle Hayes (Limerick)
8. William O’Donoghue (Limerick)
9. Tony Kelly (Clare)
10. Jack O’Connor (Cork)
11. Cian Lynch (Limerick)
12. Tom Morrissey (Limerick)
13. Aaron Gillane (Limerick)
14. Seamus Flanagan (Limerick)
15. Peter Casey (Limerick)

All Star Team of the Year
On 9 December, the All-Stars winners were announced with Limerick having a record twelve players named on the team.
Its the first time that a county has reached double figures in the final 15.
On 10 December during a televised special on RTE, Cian Lynch was named as the All Stars Hurler of the Year with Eoin Cody named the All Stars Young Hurler of the Year.

References 

2021 in hurling